Yashoda Hospitals is a chain of hospitals based in Hyderabad, Telangana, India. It has branches in Somajiguda, Secunderabad, and Malakpet, with another branch coming up in Hitec City. All of its branches are NABH and NABL accredited.

It was recognised as a leading hospital for oncology in 2015 after becoming the first hospital to achieve the milestone of treating 10,000 patients using RapidArc technology.

History 

The hospital began as a small clinic in 1989 set up by Dr G Surendar Rao. He later teamed up with his brothers G Devender Rao and G Ravender Rao to expand operations and start Yashoda Hospitals. The clinic was originally started in Madipally village, Warangal Dist, Telangana. Dheeraj Gorukanti is the CEO of Yashoda Group of Hospitals. Dr Abhinav Gorukanti operates as a director.

Branches 

The group has three branches in Hyderabad at Secunderabad, Malakpet, and Somajiguda with a combined bed capacity of 2,400. The Secunderabad branch is NABH accredited and has a capacity of over 600 beds. It also has 3000 trained staff including doctors, nurses, and support staff.

Departments 
Yashoda Group of Hospitals offers services in the following departments:

 Neurology & Neurosurgery
 Oncology
 Cardiology and cardio-thoracic surgery
 Cardiothoracic surgery 
 Nephrology and Urology
 Center for organ transplant 
 Orthopaedic
 Gynaecology
 Neonatology
 Pediatric surgery 
 Pulmonology & Bronchoscopy
 Dermatology, Cosmetic & plastic surgery 
 Radiology & imaging sciences 
 Anesthesiology 
 Pediatric Cardiology 
 General medicine 
 General surgery 
 Orthopaedics 
 Ear, nose and throat (ENT)
 Gastroenterology 
 Paediatrics

Key Specialities 
Yashoda Hospitals has been involved in medical advancements and rare cases in neurosurgery, cardiology, and oncology.

Neurosurgery

In 2017, it became the first hospital in India to install Intraoperative 3T MRI. The iMRI makes brain surgeries safer, more precise, and removes the need to perform multiple surgeries. As of 2019, over 200 complex surgeries have been performed at the hospital using the technology.

Cardiology

In 2017, Yashoda Hospitals performed the first combined heart and lung transplant in the Telugu states of Andhra Pradesh and Telangana. Doctors at Yashoda Group of hospitals regularly perform heart transplant surgeries supported by the Jeevandan scheme.

Organ Transplants

Yashoda Hospitals also performed the first robotic transplant surgery in Andhra Pradesh and Telangana in 2017. It performed 3 robot-assisted kidney transplants in its Secunderabad branch.

The group of hospitals distinguished itself by performing the first haplo-identical bone marrow transplant in the region. It has been performing heart, kidney, liver, and lung transplants for a decade (as of 2017). It has also instituted centres for organ transplants where transplants are performed regularly by working with medical centres worldwide.

Oncology

Yashoda Group of Hospitals was recognised as a leading hospital for oncology in 2015 after becoming the first hospital to achieve the milestone of treating 10,000 patients using RapidArc technology. The 10,000th patient to receive treatment using RapidArc radiotherapy was a 3-year-old girl who was cured of medulloblastoma, a malignant brain tumour.

It is equipped with the facilities to perform robotic surgeries. Doctors can perform Minimally Invasive Oncosurgery (MIOS) using this technology.

Pulmonology

The hospital performed the first lung transplantation in the Telugu states in 2012. Archana Shedge, a 34-year-old from Pune suffering from interstitial fibrosis underwent the life-saving surgery.

It launched the first International Conference and Live Workshop on Endobronchial Ultrasound (EBUS) and Advanced Lung Cancer Treatments in 2019. The hospital is equipped with advanced technology like bronchial thermoplasty, EBUS, radial EBUS, and navigational bronchoscopy and is one of the few hospitals in the world with such facilities. Yashoda Hospitals received international recognition in the field of Bronchoscopy, from the World Association of Bronchology and Interventional Pulmonology (WABIP).

Yashoda Foundation 
Yashoda Group of Hospitals launched Yashoda Foundation as a Corporate Social Responsibility (CSR) initiative. 
Over the years, it has been actively involved in helping orphans, raising awareness regarding diseases, and in providing experiential learning for students aspiring to be doctors among others.

The foundation began working with orphans in 2011 and enables them to earn a livelihood. This is done by providing free vocational courses and counselling. After the training, the youth are given a job at Yashoda Hospitals. Currently, the foundation has recognised the needs that orphans have beyond employment. Therefore, it has extended its work to provide holistic support for orphans. There are four programmes run for the purpose:

 Abhaya - offers employment training
 Varadhi - advocacy and facilitation programme
 Akshara -  provides tuition support
 Maa Kutumbam - enables family bonding among orphans and the outside.

In 2017, Yashoda Foundation arranged and performed the marriage for three orphaned girls that it had been previously supporting. Mr G Ravender Rao, the group's chairman, performed the kanyadan at the marriage ceremony.

The foundation organizes an Annual Yashoda Cancer Awareness Run on World Cancer Day, observed on 4 February. The goal of the initiative to create awareness against cancer. In 2019, over 7,000 people ran for the cause at Hyderabad. 
Yashoda Group of Hospitals also conducts Young Doctors Camp annually, wherein students who have passed ninth grade are invited to gain the first-hand experience of medical centres. 200 students are selected out of the applicants each year and are given the opportunity to experience the medical profession. The group has tied up with 40 schools, including DPS, HPS, NASR, and Geetanjali, for the cause and works with them to recruit young, aspiring doctors for the camp.

Awards and achievements

References

Hospitals in Hyderabad, India